Josip Kosor (27 January 1879 – 23 January 1961) was a Croatian novelist and playwright. Starting as a novelist depicting peasant life in Dalmatia, Kosor "graduated into a naturalist dramatist of some power". 
He was nominated for the Nobel Prize in Literature three times.

His plays Passion's Furnace (1912), The Invincible Ship (1921) and Reconciliation were translated for performance in England.

Works

 People of the universe: four Croatian plays. Translated by Paul Selver, F. S. Copeland and J. N. Duddington. London: Hendersons, 1917.
 White flames: poems translated (by the author) from Croatian, London: C. W. Daniel Co., 1929.

References

1879 births
1961 deaths
Croatian writers
Austro-Hungarian writers
Yugoslav writers